Magoula Karditsa railway station is a small railway station in the Karditsa regional unit, Thessaly. Located east of a farming community of the same name, it opened in 2001 when the line was upgraded. It is a small, unstaffed Holt.

History
The station was opened in 2001 on the old Thessaly Railways. The line was authorized by the Greek government under the law AMH’/22.6.1882. soon after the liberation of Central Greece from the Ottomans. It was, however not until 2001 this station was built

In 2001 the section between Kalampaka and Palaiofarsalos was converted from Narrow-gauge (1000 mm) to standard gauge (1435 mm) and physically connected at Palaiofarsalos with the mainline from Athens to Thessaloniki. Since to upgrade. However, travel times improved, and the unification of rail gauge allowed direct services, even InterCity services, to link Volos and Kalambaka with Athens and Thessaloniki.

In 2001 the infrastructure element of OSE was created, known as GAIAOSE; it would henceforth be responsible for the maintenance of stations, bridges and other elements of the network, as well as the leasing and the sale of railway assists. In 2005, TrainOSE was created as a brand within OSE to concentrate on rail services and passenger interface. In 2009, with the Greek debt crisis unfolding OSE's Management was forced to reduce services across the network. Timetables were cut back, and routes closed as the government-run entity attempted to reduce overheads. In 2015 a 15-year-old child was airlifted to hospital after being electrocuted at the station. In 2017 OSE's passenger transport sector was privatised as TrainOSE, currently, a wholly-owned subsidiary of Ferrovie dello Stato Italiane infrastructure, including stations, remained under the control of OSE. In July 2022, the station began being served by Hellenic Train, the rebranded TranOSE

Facilities
The Station is a basic halt, with few facilities. There are waiting rooms and ramps for wheelchairs. The station is (as of 2020) unstaffed, with no ticket-purchasing facilities or parking.

Services 
Today, the station is served by Express services to the rest of Greece via Palaiofarsalos, and Athens,  Larissa and Thessaloniki. Previously Thessaly Railways operated a narrow gauge service to Volos.

In August 2009 TrainOSE S.A. proceeded to a drastic cutback of passenger services on Thessaly lines. As of Spring 2020 There are ten  (five in each direction) Regional Express services on Palaiofarsalos-Kalambaka Line. In addition, there is one Regional Express service to Athens from Kalambaka and back (884/885).

References

External links
Sofades Station - National Railway Network - GTP

Transport in Karditsa (regional unit)
Railway stations in Thessaly
Railway stations opened in 2001
Buildings and structures in Karditsa (regional unit)